Westdeutscher Rundfunk Köln (West German Broadcasting Cologne; WDR) is a German public-broadcasting institution based in the Federal State of North Rhine-Westphalia with its main office in Cologne. WDR is a constituent member of the consortium of German public-broadcasting institutions, ARD. As well as contributing to the output of the national television channel Das Erste, WDR produces the regional television service WDR Fernsehen (formerly known as WDF and West3) and six regional radio networks.

History

Origins
The Westdeutsche Funkstunde AG (WEFAG) was established on 15 September 1924.

There was a substantial purge of left wing staff following the Nazi seizure of power in 1933. This included Ernst Hardt, Hans Stein and Walter Stern.

WDR was created in 1955, when Nordwestdeutscher Rundfunk (NWDR) was split into Norddeutscher Rundfunk (NDR) – covering Lower Saxony, Schleswig-Holstein, and Hamburg – and Westdeutscher Rundfunk, responsible for North Rhine-Westphalia. WDR began broadcasting on two radio networks (one produced jointly with NDR) on 1 January 1956. WDR constitutes the most prominent example of regional broadcasting in Germany.

Directors 
 1926–1933: Ernst Hardt, director general of WERAG
 1933–1937: Heinrich Glasmeier, director general of "Reichssender Köln"
 1937–1941: Anton Winkelnkemper, director general of "Reichssender Köln"
 1942–1945: closed
 1945–1947: Max Burghardt, director general of NWDR
 1947–1961: Hanns Hartmann, director general of NWDR and since 1956 of WDR
 1961–1976: Klaus von Bismarck
 1976–1985: Friedrich-Wilhelm von Sell
 1985–1995: Friedrich Nowottny
 1995–2007: Fritz Pleitgen
 2007–2013: Monika Piel
 since 1 July 2013: Tom Buhrow

Logo history

Funding
WDR is in part funded by the limited sale of on-air commercial advertising time; however, its principal source of income is the revenue derived from viewer and listener licence fees. As of 2023 the monthly fee due from each household for radio and television reception was €18.36. These fees are collected not directly by WDR but by a joint agency of ARD (and its member institutions), ZDF, and Deutschlandradio.

Television

WDR began its regional television service, Westdeutsches Fernsehen (WDF), on 17 December 1965. On 27 August 1967, when West Germany broadcast its first color TV program, WDF used a live broadcast originating from a Bosch outside broadcast van to start broadcasting in color. In 1988, the channel was renamed West 3; since 1994, it has been known as WDR Fernsehen.

While the programmes are mainly run from their Cologne headquarters, they also have a number of sub-regional studios contributing to a regular broadcast called Lokalzeit with the opt-outs "aus Aachen" (Aachen), "OWL" (Bielefeld), "aus Bonn" (Bonn), "aus Dortmund" (Dortmund), "aus Düsseldorf" (Düsseldorf), "aus Duisburg" (Duisburg), "Ruhr" (Essen), "aus Köln" (Cologne and Bonn), "Münsterland" (Münster), "Südwestfalen" (Siegen) and "Bergisches Land" (Wuppertal) for each respective region. WDR has its current affairs and regional politics studios in Düsseldorf.

It has served as the production entity for shows on Das Erste, such as Verbotene Liebe ('Forbidden Love'), which, over the years, has introduced many young actors to the German audience, such as Andreas Stenschke, Jo Weil, Luca Zamperoni and Kay Böger. The Sportschau is produced for ARD in Cologne, and WDR contributes to ARD Digital, 3sat and arte.

Radio

A long-running talk show on wheels was Hallo Ü-Wagen, running from 1974 to 2010, begun by Carmen Thomas.
WDR's main radio channels are available on FM and digital (DAB+), as well as via cable and satellite:

 1LIVE is a popular music channel modelled on BBC Radio 1 and aimed at a young audience. Its schedules include such non-mainstream night-time programmes as "Heimatkult", focusing on pop music from Germany, and "Lauschangriff", a series of audio-books.
 WDR 2, featuring adult-oriented popular music, focuses strongly on national and regional news, current affairs, and sport.
 WDR 3, the cultural channel, offers mostly classical, jazz and world music as well as radio drama and spoken-word features dealing with literature and the performing arts.
 WDR 4 (motto: Melodien für ein gutes Gefühl, "Melodies for a good feeling") is a channel aimed chiefly towards an older audience. Its focus is on tuneful music – in particular, oldies and classic hits: popular music of the 1960s to the 1980s or later – with more specialized programming (operetta, country, folk) in the evenings. Around 30-40% of WDR 4's musical output is made up of German-language songs.
 WDR 5 features spoken-word programming with the focus on present-day culture and society. Between 6.05 and 9.45 each Monday to Saturday morning the channel offers news, background briefing, interviews, and correspondents' reports in a sequence entitled Morgenecho. The main lunchtime and early-evening news and current affairs programmes Mittagsecho (at 13.05–14.00 on Mondays to Fridays and 13.30–14.30 on Sundays) and Echo des Tages (at 18.30–19.00 daily) are both co-productions with Norddeutscher Rundfunk (NDR) in Hamburg. Additionally, WDR 2's 30-minute round-up of the day's most important news reports, Berichte von heute, is simulcast by WDR 5 on Monday to Friday evenings at 23.30. WDR 5 also carries children's programming from KiRaKa at 19.05–20.00 each evening as well as on Sundays at 7.05–8.00 and 14.05–15.00.
 Cosmo (earlier WDR 5 Funkhaus Europa – an offshoot of WDR 5 – and now a joint production of Radio Bremen, RBB, and WDR) is a channel principally aimed at serving immigrants and promoting integration. It features a wide selection of world music. It is not available over-the-air in every part of WDR's broadcasting area.

See also
 German television
 Public broadcasting
 Rockpalast
 Studio for Electronic Music (WDR)
 WDR Symphony Orchestra Cologne (WDR Sinfonieorchester Köln)
 WDR Rundfunkorchester Köln
 WDR Rundfunkchor Köln
 WDR Computerclub

Notes

External links

 

 
ARD (broadcaster)
Radio stations in Germany
Television networks in Germany
Television stations in Germany
German-language television networks
Mass media companies of Germany
Mass media in Cologne
Television channels and stations established in 1956
Mass media in North Rhine-Westphalia
1955 establishments in Germany